This page lists the fossiliferous stratigraphic units in Cyprus.

See also 
 Lists of fossiliferous stratigraphic units in Europe
 List of fossiliferous stratigraphic units in Greece
 List of fossiliferous stratigraphic units in Northern Cyprus
 List of fossiliferous stratigraphic units in Turkey
 Geology of Cyprus
 Petra tou Romiou
 Cyprus dwarf hippopotamus
 Cyprus dwarf elephant
 Argonauta absyrtus

References

Further reading 
 L. G. Bragina. 2008. Radiolarians of the family Neosciadiocapsidae from the Turonian-Santonian of the Perapedhi Formation, southern Cyprus. Paleontological Journal 42(2):127–138
 N. Y. Bragin. 2007. Late Triassic radiolarians of southern Cyprus. Paleontological Journal 41(10):951–1029
 S. Q. Dornbos and M. A. Wilson. 1999. Paleoecology of a Pliocene coral reef in Cyprus: recovery of a marine community from the Messinian Salinity Crisis. Neues Jahrbuch für Geologie und Paläontologie, Abhandlungen 213(1):103–118
 E. Flügel. 1960. Heterastridium conglobatum conglobatum Reuss, an Upper Triassic hydrozoan from the Petra-tou-Roumiou Limestone of Pendakomo, Cyprus. Journal of Paleontology 34(1):127–132
 E. J. Follows, A. H. F. Robertson, and T. P. Scoffin. 1996. Tectonic controls on Miocene reefs and related carbonate facies in Cyprus. SEPM Concepts in Sedimentology and Paleontology 5:295–315
 D. M. Martill and M. J. Barker. 2006. A paper nautilus (Octopoda, Argonauta) from the Miocene Pakhna Formation of Cyprus. Palaeontology 49(5):1035–1041
 F. R. C. Reed. 1935. Notes on the Neogene faunas of Cyprus, II. The Annals and Magazine of Natural History 15(85):1–31 
 A. Sanfilippo, A. Hakyemez, and U.K. Tekin. 2003. Biostratigraphy of Late Paleocene- Middle Eocene radiolarians and foraminifera from Cyprus. Micropaleontology 49(1–2):47–64

.
Cyprus geography-related lists
 Cyprus
 Cyprus